Kalam Rud (also Romanized as Kalām Rūd) is a village in Somam Rural District, Rankuh District, Amlash County, Gilan Province, Iran. At the 2006 census, its population was 197, in 81 families.

References 

Populated places in Amlash County